A Corps of Drums, also sometimes known as a Fife and Drum Corps, Fifes and Drums or simply Drums is a unit of several national armies. Drummers were originally established in European armies to act as signallers. The major historical distinction between a military band and a corps of drums, was that 'drummers' were not employed to play their instruments to entertain or delight, but rather they carried out a utilitarian battlefield role. This role was fulfilled by trumpeters or buglers in the cavalry and the artillery, who did not form into comparative formed bodies in the way that drummers did; therefore, an orthodox corps of drums will exist in the infantry arm.

History

Instruments, particularly drums, have been used on battlefields as signalling devices since time immemorial across many different cultures. Most fife and drum traditions trace back to the Swiss mercenaries of the early Renaissance, and it is known that by the early 16th century, each company of infantry soldiers would have a single drummer and a single fife player. These two musicians would march at the head of the company, and when not providing uplifting marching tunes, they would be used by the company commander to convey orders, on and off the field of battle. The drummers would be more aptly described as signallers than musicians, as shouted orders were very hard to hear over the din of battle. Later, a bugle would become the preferred means of communication on the battlefield, and the drummers adapted, training on bugles and carrying them in battle, but retaining the drum and the title of drummer.

As time went on, the individual drummers and fife players in each company would be organized at battalion level.  They retained their role in each company in battle, but would form one body of men at the head of a battalion on the march. It was necessary to appoint a Drum Major (the equivalent of a Sergeant Major, for the drummers) to be in charge of the drummers and to organize training in the emerging discipline of military drumming while a fife major was to be appointed to be the principal fifer and to train future fife players. The corps of drums would group together when not on duty with each company, and carry out various roles within the battalion, such as administering military justice and ensuring soldier's billets were secured, thus, the corps of drums became attached to the battalion headquarters and was organized at battalion level, as opposed to individual company level.

United Kingdom

The British Army maintains a corps of drums in each infantry battalion except for Scottish, Irish, and Rifle Regiments (The Rifles and the Royal Gurkha Rifles) which have pipes and drums and Bugles respectively. Each battalion of a regiment of line infantry maintains a corps of drums which may be 'massed' together on certain occasions. All corps-of-drums soldiers are called  drummers (shortened to 'Dmr') regardless of the instrument they play, similarly to use of the term "sapper" for soldiers of the Royal Engineers.

Unlike army musicians who form bands and will usually be limited to auxiliary duties in wartime, drummers in a Corps of Drums are principally fully trained infantry soldiers, with recruitment coming after standard infantry training. A Corps of Drums will deploy with the rest of the battalion, and will often form specialist platoons such as assault pioneers, supporting fire or force protection.

Historically, the drum was used to convey orders during a battle, so the Corps of Drums has always been a fully integrated feature of an infantry battalion. Later on, when the bugle was adopted to convey orders, drummers were given bugles in addition, but maintained their drums and flutes, except in rifles regiments where the lighter instrument was more conducive to the skirmishing form of warfare.

Current role

Eventually, as the use of musical instruments on the battlefield diminished, corps of drums looked to fill specialist roles within the battalion while still retaining their original role for ceremonial purposes. In some armies, drummers were absorbed by bands and ceased to be the infantry soldiers, becoming full musicians.

In armies where corps of drums remained formed bodies within infantry battalions, different strings of logic have seen corps of drums employed in many varied roles. Because the corps would historically be employed in support of the battalion, in areas such as delivering mail or designating billets, they are often given the role of assault pioneers, or supporting-fire (machine gun) platoons.
The corps of drums role on the battlefield was originally to signal orders, and therefore some units are organised into signals platoons, operating radios.
Drummers would also accompany officers to meet officers of an opposing army to parley. Therefore, some corps of drums perform a liaison role.

Historical duties such as uncasing and casing of the colours on parade and various other privileges are continued in most units. Due to the specialist duties and ceremonial aspects of a drummers life, a corps of drums may be the unofficial custodian of regimental customs and traditions.

Corps of drums recruit from the whole battalion, and are usually attached to the battalion headquarters. Each corps of drums is commanded by a drum major, a senior non-commissioned officer, who usually reports to the adjutant of the battalion.

Instruments

The main instrument is the side drum. These were originally of a rope-tension design with wide wooden hoops, a wooden shell and an animal-skin head. In the British Army, this model has been continuously upgraded, with the inclusion of snares, more modern metal rod-tension and plastic heads. The current British Army 97s-pattern side drum also has nylon hoops.

The side drum was increasingly decorated throughout the 19th century, until it bore the fully embellished regimental colours of the battalion, including its battle honours. As such a regiment's drums are often afforded respect.

Historically all members of a corps of drums would be able to beat the various 'calls' on the drum, but in order to provide melody to accompany long route marches when not in combat, some would also play a fife, replaced in the modern British Army by the five-key flute. A wide variety of flutes and pitches are used. The fife and later the flute have been favoured as a warlike instrument due to shrill pitch and thus the ability to be heard above the noise of battle. Many tunes such as "The British Grenadiers" are traditionally played by military flutes. Fifes and keyed flutes were typically pitched in B, but the flute family eventually expanded to include a piccolo in E, a perfect fourth higher, and a flute pitched in F, a perfect fourth lower than the B flute. There was also a "B bass", which was pitched an octave below the B flute. Occasionally the B flute is known as the "treble" to avoid confusion with the B bass flute. The development of this family of flutes facilitated the development of flute band part music which in many ways imitates the style of larger military bands.

The bugle replaced the drum mid-way through the 19th century as the most common means of communication on the battlefield. These duties were carried out by the battalion's corps of drums, whose drummers now each carry a bugle, which can be sounded on parade to give certain orders, to offer salutes, or to play the "Last Post" (or "Taps") at funerals, in addition to playing bugle marches composed when on the march.

As the musical role of a corps of drums became more ceremonial in the 19th and 20th centuries, more instruments were added to make their output more musically complete. A modern corps of drums may thus have a range of percussion instruments such as a bass drum, tenor drums and cymbals (and occasionally glockenspiels) in addition to the snare drum, flute and bugle.

Uniform

Drummers have always worn distinct uniforms so as to stand out on the battlefield. During the 18th century most British Army drummers were distinguished by wearing their regimental uniforms in "reversed colours" – thus an infantry regiment wearing red coats with yellow facings would clothe its drummers in yellow coats with red facings. This practice tended to make drummers targets in battle and after 1812 was replaced by less conspicuous distinctions. These usually consisted of lace, used liberally all over the standard uniform, in varying patterns. Many early patterns consisted of a "Christmas-tree" pattern in which the chest was covered in horizontal lace decreasing in width downwards, and chevrons of lace down each sleeve. The modern infantry pattern in the British Army is of "crown-and-inch" lace sewn over the seams down the sleeves, around the collar, and over the seams on the back of the tunic. The Guards Divisions drummers have the old-style "Christmas-tree" pattern, with fleurs-de-lis instead of crowns.

Whilst corps of drums in the British Army often parade in combat uniforms and other forms of dress, they will usually parade in the full dress uniform as above, being one of a few formations which regularly wear full dress.

In some regiments, it has become custom for the percussion rank to wear leopard skins over their uniform. This has the dual purpose of protecting the uniform (cymbals have to be muffled against the chest, and therefore would leave vertical marks on a bare tunic) and protecting the instruments themselves (the bass drum can be scratched by uniform buttons). Modern "leopard skins" are made from synthetic fur. Other regiments opt for a simple leather or cloth apron.

Drummers have traditionally been armed with "drummers' swords", a shortsword with a simple brass hilt bearing the Royal Cypher. The practice of wearing swords has been discontinued by some regiments, though many still do carry the swords, whilst some use an SA80 bayonet as a modern alternative.

Honourable Artillery Company

The Honourable Artillery Company maintains a corps of drums, and as such is the only such sub-unit in an artillery unit in the British Army. Although the Honourable Artillery Company now fulfils an artillery role, historically it was an infantry regiment, with two battalions fighting during the Great War. The last infantry battalion was disbanded in 1973, but the corps of drums remained. As the regiment still maintains the privilege granted to it by King William IV in 1830, that the H.A.C. should dress as the Grenadier Guards, except wearing silver where the Grenadiers wear gold, the corps of drums of the HAC dresses in a very similar fashion to that of the Grenadier Guards. Just as in other corps of drums of the British Army, its personnel carry out a soldiering role as their main function.

Since the HAC is the oldest unit in existence in the British Army, and as drummers were on the establishment of infantry units at the latest during the 16th century, it may be assumed that the corps of drums of the HAC is the oldest in the British Army, though it has not been in continuous existence.

In addition, the HAC's veteran unit, the Company of Pikemen and Musketeers maintains an early form of Corps of Drums known as the 'Musik'. In this capacity, more basic fifes and larger rope-tension drums are used and 17th century uniforms are worn in keeping with the rest of the company.

Royal Logistic Corps

The Royal Logistic Corps (RLC) also maintains a corps of drums in the form of several side drummers, drawn from soldiers who serve a short tour as drummers before returning to a field unit. This is not a conventional corps of drums, as it has no flautists, and comes under the command of regimental headquarters of the RLC, rather than forming a separate entity. It frequently plays with the Band of the RLC, but often performs in isolation. It is famed for its "black light" display. These drummers stem from the 12 drummers placed on the Royal Waggon Train (RWT) in 1803. There are reserve soldiers within the Corps of Drums of 157 Regiment RLC, based at Cardiff in Wales.

At the time of Waterloo, in the period of deployment to the Low Countries, the RWT introduced drums made of brass. These originated on the Indian sub-continent. The size . They were faced in blue and carried the cypher of King George, with the title below. A few drums of the period survive today. The drumsticks were of Canadian maple, following the campaigns in North America during the Napoleonic era. The drums had drag ropes purchased from unit funds. Whilst drummers carried the bugle, the common instrument for the "Waggoners" was the fanfare trumpet on account of their cavalry traditions, and inclusion in the light cavalry. During that period the corps was then being divided between the foot soldiers, which used drums and fifes, and the mounted soldiers, with cavalry fanfare trumpets as signalling instruments. The drum sling was still that of the hook.

Royal Marines

Royal Marines Bands are led by 'buglers', who are trained on both the side drum and the bugle as well as the Herald Fanfare Trumpet (natural trumpet); this section of the band is referred to as "the Corps of Drums", which since 1903 is now situated at the front of the band. Whilst similar to Army corps of drums, these are members of the Royal Marines Band Service (RMBS), although they retain their own rank structure.  Members of the RMBS are primarily musicians; however, they also carry out secondary roles (e.g. medics, drivers, force protection etc.) when required to, like their Army counterparts.

RM Buglers have a similar history to Army 'drummers' in that they were used to convey orders on a ship on drums and bugles, and would then mass onshore into corps of drums, though they were still expected to work as individual soldiers, also known in slang by the Royal Navy as drummers.

These drummer-buglers trace themselves back to the raising of the Royal Marines in 1664 as a maritime foot regiment, with six drummers attached to its battalions.

History of Maritime Drummers
Drums were, in 1664, used for the raising of the Duke of York's and Albany's Maritime Regiment of Foot, the Admiral's Regiment. The regiment's 1,200 personnel had six snare drummers per company, the ancestors of the corps of drums of the Royal Marines Band Service. The Holland Regiment soon came after them. They were later to be called The Buffs, the Old Buffs and Howards's Buffs.

Each time a maritime regiment, or from 1672 onward, a marine regiment, is disbanded and a new one appears in its place, drummers come in, especially the young ones who liked playing drums and wanted to serve playing them. The 1702 formation of the marine and sea-service foot regiments saw the drummers' greatest action at Gibraltar, when they played the drums to support their regiments.

The War of Jenkins' Ear saw into action ten British marine regiments and an all-American marine regiment, all units whose drummers and fifers played alongside their units.

Even though part of the British Army which in the 18th century was led by the War Office, the Board of Ordnance and the Commissariat, marines were naval units. Royal Navy officers were at one point part of the marines. Due to two laws that regulated them and other army and navy units, marine drummers faced a loyalty problem over what drum calls they would have to do, and for what branch and on what occasion they might be required to play drums for orders, commands, etc.

In 1755, the problem was solved. The Admiralty took over what was then called His Majesty's Marine Forces.  Even though at first Royal Navy officers filled the officer ranks, with lieutenant-colonel being perceived as the highest relevant rank, in 1771 a promotion to colonel occurred for the first time in the H.M.M.F.

After their formation, the H.M.M.F's drummers and fifers of the three marine divisions played alongside their fellow soldiers in various landings worldwide on behalf of the Royal Navy. They joined their units in the American War of Independence, and a drummer was at James Cook's service during his sea travels.

At Adm. John Jervis's insistence, by King George III's order in 1802, the H.M.M.F. was transformed into the H.M.M.F.-Royal Marines, albeit larger than today's establishment. Two years later, bomb vessel crews and gunners became part of the newly created Royal Marine Artillery, in which bugle calls became a regular part of life from then on.

The Royal Navy in the 19th century was short of manpower in both the H.M.M.F.-R.M. and the R.M.A. For this, Army units joined the H.M.M.F.-R.M. as replacement units, carrying not only their drummers and fifers but also buglers.

In 1855, during the units' service in the Crimean War, the H.M.M.F.-R.M's foot units became one under the unified title of Royal Marines Light Infantry, later known as the Royal Marine Light Infantry. From then, bugles replaced drums as signallers and order beaters, but the latter would be still useful for drill, being then called drummers and buglers, and from 1867 the R.M.L.I./R.M.A. drummers were called "buglers" only, serving individually in ships and the R.N's shore establishments and artillery units and massed into corps of drums for their units on the ground. Fifes fully declined and disappeared in usage. By then, a bugler playing both the drum and his bugle both to sound orders and do drum calls was a common sight in the RMLI and RMA. By the 1890s, even buglers also trained in using herald trumpets or Fanfare trumpets became commonplace in RMLI and RMA bases and facilities.
A 1902 incident changed the buglers forever. A Coronation Review at Aldershot was due soon, and the then Sr. Bandmaster of the RMLI, Lt. George Miller, asked his fellow bandmasters to get buglers for his band for the review. The next day at a church parade, he asked 30 RMLI buglers to front the RMLI Massed Bands. They then marched to his own arrangement of Onward Christian Soldiers. Everyone was shocked by this and were amazed that the formation that he used would become a RMLI and RMA military band standard formation setup, and the precision stick drills that he made became a permanent fixture in military events where either or both the RMLI and RMA's presence were needed. Soon later, when the RM began operating the Royal Naval School of Music the next year as a training venue for future bandsmen of the RN, RMLI and RMA, they brought this formation for Royal Navy bands as well, inspiring the formations used by modern military bands of some Commonwealth countries like Australia, Singapore, Malaysia and Brunei.

1923 would see the buglers of the R.M.L.I. and R.M.A. now belong to the Corps of Royal Marines, the Royal Marines of today. Seeing action during the Second World War and in the growing crisis of the Cold War were the R.M.'s brave buglers of the new Royal Marines Band Service, even through separate from the bands themselves. The R.M.A. and R.M.L.I. buglers' dress uniforms (dark blue trousers and tunic and red collars and trouser wells) became the full dress of the corps bands and buglers, with the addition of a Wolseley pith helmet as headdress, and yellow shoulder cords and slashed cuffs to indicate their long history, heritage and lineage from 1664.

By 1950, the R.N.S.o.M. became today's Royal Marines School of Music, and the Royal Naval bands were dissolved. Beating retreats by both the Royal Marine bands and the R.M. Corps of Drums buglers would begin to occur annually, later triennially and as of today biannually, at Horse Guards Parade, Portsmouth and other venues, playing for the entire Royal Navy and the Royal Marines. It would be only in 1978 that the R.M.B.S. would have buglers as well in its rosters. By the 1990s, however, only five R.M. corps of drums were left as the Deal Depot closed down in 1996, the Chatham band already dissolved in the 1940s, with three at the R.N. England bases in Portsmouth, Plymouth and at the Britannia Royal Naval College till 2008 (The last is now assigned to ), one in the R.M.S.o.M. (then in Deal and now in Portsmouth since 1996) and another one in Scotland at HMS Caledonia. By the 1950s, only the band carried the corps at the lead, as separate corps of drums, which played only bugles alongside the drums, were discontinued altogether (these were adopted in the 1880s when the RM began to transition from fifes to bugles).

Today there are six R.M. Bands (plus the training company, R.M.S.o.M. Junior Musicians and Buglers) located around the UK, in Portsmouth (three in HMS Nelson, which includes the R.M.S.o.M.), Fareham (HMS Collingwood), Plymouth (HMS Raleigh), Lympstone (Commando Training Centre Royal Marines) and Scotland (HMS Caledonia) for a total of seven bands and attached corps of drums.  All members of the R.M.B.S. are trained at the Royal Marines School of Music (HMS Nelson). Buglers' training lasts two years. Basic military skills are taught during four months of initial military training and, if successful, trainee buglers are instructed on the bugle, drum and herald/fanfare trumpets. Musical skills are refined and supported with additional lessons in music theory and aural perception. Parade work forms a large part of the curriculum and considerable time is spent developing personal drill and bearing.

Today's R.M. Corps of Drums contains approximately 60 buglers who carry out duties ranging from repatriation services (Last Post and Reveille), mess beatings (drum displays), beating retreat (marching displays) and concerts on behalf of the Royal Marines and the entire Royal Navy.

Instruments and leadership
Like the British Army, Military snare (side) drums (MSD) are the principal instrument of the corps of drums; however, another core instrument is the bugle. Bass drums are often used during parades and drum displays, while cymbals and single tenor drums are used during parades and ceremonies only. Herald Fanfare trumpets (natural trumpets) are also performed on such occasions where a bugle fanfare would be inappropriate for such. The corps is led by a drum major and a bugle major serves as the principal player for it.

Drummer's Colour

The Drummer's Colour, also known as the Wilhelmsthal Colour, is a unique colour held by 1st Battalion, Royal Regiment of Fusiliers. A drummer, usually the youngest in the battalion, is detailed to carry it when it is on parade.

History
At the battle of Wilhemstahl in 1762, the 5th Foot led the centre column under the command of Prince Ferdinand of Brunswick. During this action, they captured the colour of an opposing French regiment, and took a large number of prisoners.
After this date, the regiment carried a small green silk banner in addition to their usual stand of colours to commemorate the one they captured. This was destroyed along with the Regimental Colour by a fire in the Officer's Mess in 1833. Despite representations made to King William IV, a request to replace the Drummer's Colour following the fire was refused. However the regiment continued to parade a replacement, and was granted specific permission to do so by King George V in 1933.

Since then, a drummer has been entrusted with carrying the colour. This is unique within infantry regiments of the British Army, since colours are normally only entrusted to commissioned officers, except when they are in the custody of sergeants to convey them to an ensign. The Drummer's Colour is typically paraded only on St. George's Day, unlike the other colours of the regiment, which are used more frequently. On this day, it is decorated with red and white roses, in keeping with regimental custom which sees all members of the regiment wear the roses in their headdress on this day. The drums of the Corps of Drums and the drum major's staff are also similarly decorated.

When the Royal Northumberland Fusiliers were amalgamated with other regiments to form the Royal Regiment of Fusiliers in 1968, the tradition of carrying the Drummer's Colour was maintained by the 2nd Battalion. When this battalion was in turn 'deleted' in 2014 as a result of the Strategic Defence and Security Review 2010, the Drummer's Colour was passed to the 1st Battalion.

Appearance and charges
The Drummer's Colour is of gosling green silk edged with gold. St. George and the Dragon are embroidered in the centre, with red scrolls edged with gold above and below. The motto of the Northumberland Fusiliers,  (Go where divine providence leads), is displayed on the upper scroll, and the word 'Northumberland' is on the lower. Above the lower scroll is a large 'V' with 'Regt' below, both in gold, indicating that the Northumberland Fusiliers were the 5th Regiment of Foot at the time of the battle. A laurel wreath with red berries surrounds the central elements, and Tudor roses surmounted by crowns feature in the four corners.

British civilian and cadet corps of drums
In addition to Army and Navy/Royal Marines Corps of Drums, in the United Kingdom there are also cadet- civilian corps who base their music on the military traditions of the country. The Army Cadet Force corps use the Army-style formations and instrumentation (flutes/bugles, snare, bass and tenor drums, cymbals and Glockenspiels), save for those with Scottish and Irish links that have Pipe bands instead and those affiliated with the light infantry (especially the now only LI regiment The Rifles) have a corps of drums without the fifes while using only bugles. Those corps of the Combined Cadet Force, Royal Marines Volunteer Cadet Corps and the Sea Cadet Corps use the RN/RM naval and ship-style corps (Snare/Side drums/Bugles, Bass and Tenor drums, cymbals and glockenspiels) and are attached to the main band or are separate formations. This formation is also used by the military band of the Duke of York's Royal Military School. Another example of a military style CoD is that of the Royal British Legion, whose bands are modeled on the Royal Navy and Royal Marines Band Service. The Royal Air Force however does not have any such ensembles, and only Corps of Drums under the Royal Air Force Air Cadets are active, with their formation being similar to those of the RN and RM.

The Metropolitan Police restarted a Corps of Drums in 2011, when the central youth engagement unit purchased some drums and sent cadets on a "band camp". Greenwich borough subsequently took a caretaker role of the drums and established a corps of drums. 2015 saw Kensington and Chelsea and Hillingdon Boroughs expanding and creating more branches. It is the first band in the Metropolitan Police to be composed of members of the Metropolitan Police since 1988. It is also the first band in the name of the Metropolitan Police since 1997, when the civilianised Metropolitan Police Band was disbanded.

Civilian corps of drums are also formatted after their respective services, with corps patterned after those of the Army, Navy and the Royal Marines in instrumentation and marching style becoming commonplace. These are staffed by both veteran and retired military drummers as well as civilian drummers playing the fifes, bugles and percussion. In Northern Ireland, civilian corps are mounted by Loyalist groups, which for the most part use flutes with no bugles at all. A number of formations use accordions instead of flutes.

United States
A corps of drums or field music band in the United States is a type of military band, which originated in European armies in the 16th century. The main instruments of a corps of drums are the drum and the flute or fife and bugle. Unlike 'full' military marching bands, corps of drums usually exist within an infantry battalion. A drum major is the leader of a corps of drums, and in the past a fife major served as the principal fifer or flautist with a bugle major serving the same purpose for the buglers. The DM, like his/her British counterparts, uses a mace for both vocal and visual commands to lead his/her musicians. The tradition stems the days of British colonial rule, when local units in the then 13 British territories sported own fife and drum ensembles, a tradition brought by the British infantry regiments that landed in these lands. The formation mirrors those in the British Armed Forces with almost identical instrumentation.

Valley Forge Military Academy and College has a corps of drums that is part of the regimental band. Uniforms and music are modelled on the Royal Marines Corps of Drums. VFMAC does have a similar but separate formation which is part of the Corps of Cadets (VFMAC Field Music) which only uses drums (snares, tenors and basses), cymbals and bugles and from 2011, fifes. Formed in 1956, it also provides the official guard-of-honour for visitors to the Delaware Valley area.

The United States Army Old Guard Fife and Drum Corps, raised in 1960 and part of the 3rd US Infantry Regiment (The Old Guard) of the United States Army, formally revived this very part of American military music history and its mission is to relive it for coming generations. This is the only musical unit of the US armed forces in which its drum major, wearing a classic 18th century infantry cap and carrying a spontoon, the honor badge and weapon of 18th century senior non-commissioned officers, salutes using the left hand. Musicians assigned to this unit wear 18th century military uniforms reminiscent of those used in the American Revolutionary War by the Continental Army drummers and fifers. Another corps of drums is found as part of the West Point Band - the West Point Hellcats, which wear regulation uniforms from the 1820s, and since 2016 play using bugles, fifes and traditional rope tension snare and bass drums.  Until the late 19th century the US Army and the United States Marine Corps maintained similar ensembles before switching to bugles.

Formation of field music/corps of drums in the US Armed Forces and civilian organizations  
While only the Old Guard FDC is the only field music formation in the US Armed Forces and thus more similar to a European corps of drums, in the past there had been similar formations armed forces-wide. Should such units be reactivated again not just in the Armed Forces but also as civilian, veterans or youth cadet formations, the formation of the ensemble is as follows (the formation is to be expected to be led by a drum major):

 Field snare drums
 Snare drums
 Bass drums
 Cymbals (optional)
 Single tenor drums (optional)
 Glockenspiels (optional)
 Fifes
 Piccolos, Flutes (optional)
 Bugles in B and/or G Major
 Chromatic fanfare Trumpets in B or G Major (optional)
 Single-valve bugles (Only in the Old Guard FDC)
 Soprano and Baritone Herald Fanfare Bugles (optional)
 Soprano and Baritone Herald fanfare trumpets (optional)
 Soprano Bugles
 Alto bugles
 Flugelhorn Bugles
 French horn bugles
 Mellophones
 Baritone Bugles
 Marching Baritones
 Euphonium bugles
 Marching euphoniums
 Contrabass bugles

Germany
In Germany, Spielmannszug, Tambourkorps and sometimes Trommlerkorps are the names given to the German corps of drums, whether it is a military formation or a civilian formation. The instrumentation of these are, commonly fifes and snare drums (just like the Bundeswehr corps of drums that are attached to the unit military bands), flutes and piccolos, Glockenspiels, Bass drums, cymbals and, on some corps, single and multiple tenor drums, and like their British counterparts, bugles (in several corps). Timpani, vibraphones and marimbas, as well as drum kits, are used in concerts. Sometimes even a Turkish crescent is used to symbolize the band, with a banner or guidon with the ensemble emblem. Whatever the configuration, a drum major always leads the corps during military and civil parades and other events, and in modern corps even majorettes and pom pom dancers are a part of its roster.

Military corps of drums belong and are attached to the bands of the Bundeswehr Military Music Center under the Bundeswehr Streitkräftebasis while civilian corps are dedicated civil bands and youth bands assigned in cities and towns all over Germany.

From 1955 to 1990, the National People's Army maintained corps of drums in the same manner as the Bundeswehr. During the Republic Day parades on 7 October in East Berlin from 1959 to 1989, the national corps included single tenor drums at the front.

Russia/CIS/Nations with Russian influence

Russian  or drummers are names that are used to refer to Russian military corps of drums, a practice that is of Imperial origin in the field drummers that marched at the lead of their units in parades and that is a part of the traditions of almost all former Soviet republics (save for the Baltics and Georgia). Russian drum corps are usually made up of snare drummers with one line of flute or fife players in the middle and two glockenspiels in the front (with the option for a third one or a Turkish crescent, plus chromatic fanfare trumpeters, buglers, trumpeters and trombonists). Military corps of drums are usually made separate from the massed military bands of the unit or command that it is a part of, and are led by a drum major who is a commissioned officer of minimum junior officer rank. Until 1970, all corps of drums in major parades in key Soviet cities stationed themselves following their march past in parades to reinforce the massed bands, a tradition introduced in Moscow in the 1930s and a spinoff of the former Imperial Russian and German practice. 

Historically, the corps of drums is a military unit that is formally a part of the junior military high schools of these countries. Uniquely, the Azerbaijani Armed Forces follows the Turkish model by attaching a full bugle formation behind the corps of drums.

List of Post-Soviet units/institutions with corps of drums
Moscow Military Music College
All Suvorov Military Schools (i.e. Minsk, Yekaterinburg, Kazan)
All Nakhimov Naval Schools (the Murmansk branch for example)
Kronstadt Sea Cadet Corps 
Black Sea Fleet Naval Training Center Sevastopol
Ivan Bohun Military High School
Monte Melkonian Military College
Jamshid Nakhchivanski Military Lyceum
Astana Zhas Ulan Republican School
Mastibek Tashmukhamedov Military Lyceum of the Ministry of Defense of Tajikistan
Berdimuhamed Annayev 1st Specialized Military School
Military Music College of Mongolia
Georgi Atanasov Military Music School (until 2001)

Sweden 
Only the Life Guards King's Guard Battalion has a corps of drums organized as a platoon - the Svea Corps of Drums (Fältpiparkåren/Livgardets trumkår) which is part of the battalion's Life Company, which serves as guards of honor. Until 2009 the Royal Swedish Army Drum Corps served as the official active field music unit of both the Army and the entire Armed Forces, and thus only the Home Guard Command maintains the practice with dedicated ensembles in several areas of the country.

Both the Svea Corps and the Army Drum Corps share the same instrumentation as a British corps with a brass section added.

Spain 
Only four Armed Forces formation in Spain carry a full corps of drums led by drum majors, which play the fife or keyed flute with the drumline. The tradition arrived in Spain during the long existence of the Tercio system.

The Spanish Royal Guard and the Infantry Regiment "Inmemorial del Rey" No. 1 both continue the traditions of the corps. In addition the two regiments of the Regulares have an unusual form of a corps of drums dubbed as Nuba, which date to 1911 and thus combines the instrumentation with chirimias, bugles, trumpets and cornets.

Canada 
The sole corps of drums that is active within the Canadian Army today is the Corps of Drums of Princess Patricia's Canadian Light Infantry. Being a musical unit, it replaces the regimental band of the PPCLI, which was dissolved in 1994. Based on the British tradition for these units, it is modeled on the Corps of Drums of the Royal Logistic Corps of the British Army. The regimental drum corps is divided into three units which are assigned to different battalions in the PPCLI. These individual drum corps operate as small drum lines that serve during different ceremonies and events. Unlike their British and American counterparts, but more similar to the Corps of Drums of the RLC, the drum corps does not utilize flutes and bugles. An example of a historical corps of drums can be found through the Fort Henry Guard and the Fort York Guard, both of which sport corps of drums that include fifes and are led by a Drum Major and a Drum Sergeant. Although it is not part of the Canadian Forces, it is designed to represent the units of the British Army in Upper Canada. During WWII, many regiments maintained small corps of drums that were stationed at all
major bases. While most of them were staffed by active duty troops, others were staffed by volunteer bandsmen, consisting of reservists and professional civilian percussionists.

In the Royal Canadian Navy, corps of drums have been historically attached to military bands at the front-rank following the precedent the bands of the Royal Navy and the Corps of Royal Marines. After the 1968 Unification of the Canadian Armed Forces, corps of drums in both the RCN, were dismantled and abolished, although notably making a return in the mid-1980s within the naval reserve. In July 2013, a five-person corps of drums was unveiled for the first time by the Naden Band of Maritime Forces Pacific a Victoria Day Parade.

Netherlands and in Indonesia
Drum bands are the Dutch and Indonesian terms for the corps of drums, but in the Netherlands they are also called as drumfanfares, tamboerkorps, trompetterkorps and klaroenkorps (drum and lyre bands, fanfare bands and drum and brass bands) and in Indonesia as marching bands and drum corps.

In the Netherlands, the basic instrumentation is

 Field snare drums
 Snare drums
 Bass drums
 Multiple and single tenor drums
 Cymbals
 Glockenspiels
 Flutes, Fifes
 Piccolos
 Bugles, Natural trumpets, fanfare trumpets
 Natural horns (few bands only)
 Cor de chasse (few civil bands)
 Turkish crescent (optional)
 Brass section/Marching brass (in few bands)
 Trumpet
 Cornet
 Soprano Bugle
 Flugelhorn
 Trombone 
 Tuba
 Helicon, Sousaphone

Military drum bands in the armed forces of the Netherlands would have only two to four of these basic instruments.

Optional or permanent instruments in these bands are flutes and piccolos, bugles, natural horns, valved bugles and brass instruments (soprano bugles and trumpets, cornets, horns, mellophones, baritones, sousaphones and contrabass bugles).

These bands are attached to the main marching band, similar to French bands, but also perform as stand alone bands. They are led by a drum major, and can have majorettes and colour guards, the latter now more separated from the band. The former Drum and Bugle Corps of the Rifle Guards Regiment was led by a bugle major.

In the 1980s however these bands became paramilitary-styled and even adopted the traditions of British military bands of the Guards Division and the Royal Marines, but several of these bands chose the American marching band and drum and bugle corps practice. Some of these bands also adopted woodwind instruments turning them into full-time military marching bands, and almost all drum bands use English voice commands and not Dutch commands and only a few use whistle commands and the mace movements.

In Indonesia, the corps, a military musical heritage from Dutch colonial times and a variant of the tanjidor marching band tradition, may be treated as military, civil or school marching and show bands, and in some cases as drum and bugle corps, and are either attached to the main marching band or as stand-alone bands, with instrumentation drawn from the following:

 Snare drums
 Bass drums
 Single tenor drums
 Multiple tenor drums
 Cymbals
 Glockenspiels
 Melodicas (in school marching bands)
 Fanfare trumpets (chromatic and/or herald) (optional)
 Bugles (optional)
 Flutes, piccolos (in the Indonesian National Armed Forces)
 Fifes (optional in the Indonesian National Armed Forces)
 Clarinets (in the Indonesian National Armed Forces)
 Trumpets, cornets and soprano bugles
 Alto bugles
 Flugelhorns and flugel bugles
 Trombones (optional in the Indonesian National Armed Forces)
 Horns, mellophones and horn bugles
 Baritone bugles, baritone horns and marching baritones
 Wagner tubas (optional)
 Tubas, euphoniums, saxhorns (optional)
 Contrabass bugles, sousaphones

If a civilian front ensemble is present:
 Marimba
 Vibraphone
 Xylophone
 Suspended cymbals
 Tubular bells
 Gong
 Drum kit
 Timpani
 Concert bass drumm
 Timbales
 Conga 

If with added saxophones, the corps turns into a full marching band, a tradition in the Home Affairs Governance Colleges.

They are led by from one to six drum majors and can have a separate director of music (in civil and police bands only), majorettes and Colour guards (optional). The drum majors in these bands have a unique use of the mace in order to coordinate the timing and precision of the band like US marching band drum majors do. The Indonesian corps also has dancing bass drummers either wearing uniforms or costumes (such is the case in the corps of drums of the various Indonesian uniformed organizations, most especially the armed forces and the national police), a unique feature of these corps and are attached to it and are also a nod to Indonesian cultural traditions, plus dancing contrabass buglers and baritone buglers in some bands. The brass instruments are pitched in C, F or B major unlike US military DBCs, most notably that of the United States Marine Drum and Bugle Corps that use G major brasses and civilian corps in the past, and so too are the glockenspiels being used and the flutes and clarinets.

Another unique characteristic is that in military and police corps of drums, tenor and bass drummers, baritone buglers (optionally) and contrabass buglers wear combat, duty or everyday uniform (and optionally costumes for the tenor drummers) instead of the full dress uniform while playing, whether in performance, field practice or rehearsals, unlike their British counterparts do. They wear berets, ball caps or side caps as head-dress, unlike the rest of the band, who wear peaked caps, especially the drum majors and in civil bands, the director of music, the color guards and the pit section during field performances. Bands of the Armed Forces academies tend to have their single tenor drummers wear their specialty uniform and colored berets of the selected service arm or branch, with those of the Navy wearing free diving gear and the Air Force flightsuits.

Ancient style corps of drums in Indonesia 

The practice was introduced to the Netherlands East Indies in the early 1800s, and today both the Yogyakarta Kraton Guards and the Royal Guard of Pakualaman each sport an ancient form of the corps, alongside a recently reconstituted formation from the Royal Guard of the Surakarta Sunanate. Alongside them, both the southern regencies of Central Java and Yogyakarta have dedicated civilian corps, each serving the bregodo rakyat (people's brigade) companies that conserve the traditions of the armed services of the former sultanates. These corps, when formed up in parade, are composed of:

 Snare drums
 Fifes, flutes, suling flutes
 Bugle/s
 Trumpet/s (in some civil bands)
 One to three Kendangs
 Single tenor drum/s (in civil bands)
 Cymbals
 Bass drum (in civil bands and in Surakarta)
 Gong/s

South America
Inspired by the German (and sometimes French) style corps of drums, South American corps differ in instrumentation, size and leadership.

Chile
Similar to the German corps, the Chilean corps of drums are both military and civil bands, the Bandas de Guerra (War Bands) that the Chileans call them formally.

Military corps of drums belong to the Chilean Armed Forces' three services, the Carabineros de Chile and the Chilean Gendarmerie and differ in instrumentation and officers in charge (only in the Chilean Navy).

Chilean Army: Snare drums, fifes, bugles (led by a drum major and a bugle major)
Chilean Navy: Snare drums, fifes, bugles (led by a drum major)
Chilean Air Force: Snare drums, bugles (led by a drum major and a bugle major)
Chilean Carabiners: Snare drums, bugles (led by a drum major and a bugle major)
Chilean Gendarmerie: Snare drums, bugles (led by a drum major and a bugle major)

The military style corps also inherit the British corps' tradition of carrying drummers' swords attached to belts in all their dress uniforms.

Civilian corps are usually school based bands with the addition of a percussion section (Snare drums, bass drums and cymbals) and glockenspiels and are either part of a school marching band or as a standalone band in itself. In these separate bands, a fife major leads the band's fifers/flautists while on duty, and also assist the drum major and the bugle major. These positions also exists on corps which are now part of school bands, as well as in a few volunteer community fire departments. These civil corps perform on occasions when requested and participate in competitions.

Ecuador
Corps of drums in Ecuador are both military and civil bands. These corps are very similar to the German corps, but with the addition of bugles and the single tenor drum.

Like the Chilean corps, these bands have differences in configuration and instrumentation in the Ecuadorian armed forces. But the corps snare and tenor (sometimes bass) drummers often play on drums that are painted in the service or unit colours (sometimes in the colours of Guayaquil, which are blue and white for the corps of the Ecuadorian Navy) and in the case of the Military Academy "Eloy Alfaro" and the Air Force Academy "Cosme Rendella", have the unit/school insignia attached to the bugles' and fifes' tabards.

The typical Ecuadorian corps, called as the Peloton Comando (Commando Platoon) but are also called as the Banda de Guerra (War Band), just like in Chile in several schools and colleges (many bands now fall under the Banda Escolar or Banda de Paz title due to recent state reforms), is led by a drum major (in several cases there would be 1 to 4 drum majors) and is composed of:

Snare drums
Fifes (common only in the Ecuadorian Army and Ecuadorian Air Force and school bands)
Bugles and natural trumpets (common in all three services, principal instrument in the Ecuadorian Navy)
Single tenor drums
Bass drums (optional and common in some corps)
Cymbals (optional and in some corps)
Glockenspiels
Multiple tenor drums (only in school bands)

Ecuadorian Civil corps of drums are similar only to the Army and Air Force corps but are based as youth bands stationed in schools across the nation. Notable exceptions include the Corps of Drums of the Ecuadorian National Police. Like military corps, they are led by a drum major in all their activities but there are cases of multiple drum majors leading, from a minimum of two to a maximum of four or five. But in some corps, there are some majorettes and tambourine players. Those that are based on the Navy's corps of drums (especially Guayaquil-based corps) use the same instrumentation as its corps have.

Venezuela
Similar to Germany and Colombia's, the Venezuelan corps of drums are both military and civil bands, and like Colombia's, Peru's and Ecuador's contain the same instrumentation of :

Snare drums
Bass drums
Cymbals
Single tenor drums
Glockenspiels
Bugles (and optionally trumpets)

The corps is led by a single drum major. In some corps, especially in civil-based ones, other brass instruments may be added into the bugle section.

Military corps have tabards applied on the bass drums, snare drums, glockenspiels and bugles on every occasion that it is performing. One such formation is the Military Academy of Venezuela Corps of Drums. Recently there's an effort to build up full-time military marching bands in the national armed forces with the percussion of the corps combined with brass and woodwind instruments.

Bolivia
Corps of drums in Bolivia, both military and civil, are inspired by German and French band practices and are part of the main band. The instruments used by them are snare drums, tenor drums (single and multiple), bass drums, cymbals and sometime glockenspiels. Turkish crescents are used as standards and are paraded as part of them. In military corps attached to bands there would be one to two drum majors and in some cases standards or vertical banners are used to distinguish the corps when on parade. Civil corps attached to marching bands would have one to eight drum majors (in some cases ten) and would also have a military-styled colour guard marching with the Turkish crescents and optionally the standards.

Peru
Peruvian corps of drums are both military (Banda de guerra) and civil bands (Banda ritmica), with differences in instrumentation. In whatever combination, it's a main part of the main school or military marching band led by the Director of Music, with the drum major or majorette or standard bearer leading led by the conductor or as a separate band led by the drum major or standard bearer at the front of the ensemble. These follow the Spanish and French influence.

Corps of drums in the Peruvian Armed Forces and the National Police of Peru (formerly the Civil Guard of Peru, Peruvian Investigations Police and Peruvian Republican Guard), plus school or college based bands and corps attached to them or as separate bands are composed of snare and or field drums, single tenor drums, multiple tenor drum (in school corps), bugles and glockenspiels in addition to the regular snare and bass drums and cymbals. Tambourines are common within the school-based corps, with female majorettes assisting the conductor or the school band drum major or music director. Tabards are applied only on the bugles and glockenspiels, as well as in the snare and tenor drums if applicable.

Colombia
Colombian corps of drums ar similar to those of Ecuador, Peru, Chile and Venezuela but are different in leadership, being led by a minimum of 3-7 drum majors or majorettes, and are composed instrumentally of:

 Snare drums
 Field/precision snare drums
 Bass drums
 Single tenor drums
 Multiple tenor drums (civil corps)
 Cymbals
 Glockenspiels
 Bugles and trumpets
 Natural trumpets (military corps only and in several civil corps)
 Trombones (optional, only in select military corps)
 Saxhorns (only in select military corps)
 Bagpipes (in the corps of drums of the Colombian Naval Academy and the Basic School of the Colombian Naval Infantry)
 Tambourines (civil corps)
 Conga drums (civil Corps)
 Timbales (civil corps)
 Cowbells (civil corps)
 Suspended cymbals (civil corps)

Civil corps would also have a separate conductor, occasionally standard bearers and colour guards marching along.

Even through separate from the main marching band, a part of the band itself or as a band of its own, they are both useful as military-based and civil-based marching bands. The drums are either covered with cloth tabards of the unit or band to which the corps belongs, or painted in various colours to suit its needs.  The bugles, trumpets and glockenspiels (and in military units and several civil bands, natural trumpets) are attached with small tabards with the military service, police, school or college insignia, name or emblem shown in them.

Central America 
Known as Bandas de Guerra or banda tradicional in Spanish, the Corps of drums tradition is also active in the following Central American countries:

 Guatemala
 El Salvador
 Honduras
 Panama

The Guatemalan corps tradition is mostly active in school-based corps, which mirror drum and bugle corps of the US and Mexico, the same case in Honduras and occasionally in El Salvador. In Panama, both the Public Forces and educational institutions maintain a corps section in bands while some are standalone formations. In Nicaragua, only the Nicaraguan Armed Forces sports a small corps manned by officer cadets modeled on Mexican precedent. School based bands are known as bandas ritmicas following the Peruvian pattern and are percussion only.

See also
 Military band
 Marching band
 Police band (music)
 Pipe band
 Fanfare trumpet
 Fanfare band

References

External links
Coldstream Guards Corps of Drums website
Regimental Band of The Royal Welsh Guards Corps of Drums website
Corps of Drums Society
Corps of Drums of The Royal Logistic Corps
Kirab Drum Corps Akpol

Types of musical groups
Marching bands
Military bands
Combat occupations